Theodora Komnene was a grandniece of Manuel I Komnenos, Byzantine emperor, a possible daughter of John Komnenos and of Maria Taronitissa, and the second wife of Bohemond III, prince of Antioch.

She was the mother of :
 Constance (died young)
 Philippe, married Baudouin Patriarch
 Manuel (1176 † 1211)

Her granduncle Manuel I Komnenos died in 1180. Therefore, Bohemond believed that the alliance with Byzantium wouldn't be beneficial anymore and divorced Theodora.

Theodora then remarried to Walter of Béthune, son of the lord of Bethsan.

Sources 
 
 

12th-century Byzantine people
Theodora Komnene, Princess of Antioch
Theodora Komnene, Princess of Antioch